Demerara may refer to:
 Demerara, historical region in Guyana that was a Dutch colony in 17th and 18th centuries and then part of British colonies in 19th and 20th centuries
 Demerara-Essequibo, British colony created in 1812 by combining the colonies of Demerara and Essequibo
 Demerara rebellion of 1823 that took place in Demerara-Essequibo
 Demerara sugar, a natural brown sugar from Guyana
 Demerara syrup, a combination of Demerara sugar, a natural brown sugar, and water
 Demerara River, a river of Guyana
 Demerara Harbour Bridge on the Demerara River
 Demerara window, a type of window used in hot climates
 Demerara is a book written by Harriet Martineau
 HMS Demerara a mercantile schooner (previously called Anna) purchased by the British Royal Navy in 1804
 PS Demerara a paddle steamer which ran aground in 1851
 Demerara Distillers, manufacturing company in Guyana producing El Dorado Rum
 Demerara Falls tree frog (Boana cinerascens), a species of frog
 Radio Demerara, one of the oldest radio stations in Guyana
 Demerara cricket team

See also 
The regions of Guyana:
 Demerara-Mahaica
 Essequibo Islands-West Demerara
 Upper Demerara-Berbice